Passalus punctiger, common name passalid beetle, is a beetle of the family Passalidae.

Description
Body is flattened  and completely black, with yellowish hairs on elytral shoulders and anterior sides. Elytra show deep grooves and a strong punctation. Antennae have long lamellae.

Distribution and habitat
This species occurs in Arizona, Mexico and in Central and Southern America up to Paraguay and Argentina. It also is present on the Galapagos Islands.

Life cycle
These beetles live under and inside rotten logs. Females lay eggs are in tunnels into the wood.  This species has one brood or generation per year (univoltine).

Gallery

References

Passalidae
Beetles of North America
Beetles of South America
Arthropods of Colombia
Insects of Mexico
Insects of the United States
Fauna of the Southwestern United States